The discography of American alternative rock band Neon Trees consists of four studio albums, three extended plays, eighteen singles and fifteen music videos.

The band's first release, the extended play Start a Fire, was released in 2009. The same year, they released their debut single "Animal". The single peaked at number 13 on the US Billboard Hot 100 and topped the Billboard Alternative Songs chart. "Animal" was later certified double platinum by the Recording Industry Association of America (RIAA). Neon Trees released their debut studio album Habits in March 2010. The album peaked at number 113 on the US Billboard 200 and also hit the Australian and United Kingdom albums charts. "1983" and "Your Surrender", the album's second and third singles, peaked in the top 30 of the Alternative Songs chart. The band's 2011 single "Everybody Talks" peaked at number six on the Billboard Hot 100, giving the band their first top ten hit on the chart. Picture Show, their second studio album, was released in April 2012; it peaked at number 17 on the Billboard 200.

Albums

Studio albums

Extended plays

Singles

As lead artist

Promotional singles

As featured artist

Guest appearances

Music videos

Notes

References

External links
 Neon Trees at AllMusic
 
 

Discographies of American artists
Pop music group discographies
Rock music group discographies